Devil Town is an American independent mystery film, written and directed by Harvey Mitkas. The film marks Mitkas' directoral debut. It stars Sophia Takal, Lawrence Michael Levine, Noah Gershman, Lindsay Burdge, Jennifer Kim, and Alex Ross Perry. The film had its world premiere on April 16, 2015, at the Sarasota Film Festival.

Plot
A young woman's sister goes missing. To find her missing sister, she sets out on a quest throughout Brooklyn, enlisting a crew of the weirdest people in the city.

Cast
 Sophia Takal as Eve Phillips
 Lawrence Michael Levine as Beau Hawthorne
 Noah Gershman as Tom Hallerman
 Lindsay Burdge as Isabel Phillps 
 Jennifer Kim as Collen Conway
 Alex Karpovsky as Terrance Bard
 Alex Ross Perry as Detective Ira Goldberg

Marketing
On April 16, 2015, an official teaser and image for the film was released.

Release
The film had its world premiere at the Sarasota Film Festival on April 16, 2015. and went on to screen at the Brooklyn International Film Festival on June 3, 2015. and the Northside Film Festival on June 9, 2015. The film was released through NoBudge.com, an independent film premiere-streaming website on September 29, 2015.

References

2015 films
American independent films
American mystery films
2010s mystery films
Films about missing people
Films set in Brooklyn
2015 directorial debut films
2010s English-language films
2010s American films